Meagen Marree Nay (born 5 October 1988) is a competitive swimmer from Australia. She competed in the 2008 Olympic Games in the 200-metre backstroke and placed seventh in the final. Nay is a former Australian record holder in the 200-metre backstroke.

She is the daughter of Robert Nay, who competed at the 1972 Olympics in Munich, Germany. However, her father did not live to see her swim, having been killed in a car crash in 1992. Her brother, Amos Nay, was killed in July 2009, also in a car crash. Nay was due to swim the 200-metre backstroke and 200-metre freestyle at the 2009 World Championships, but returned home to grieve her brother's death after swimming in the preliminaries of the 4×100-metre freestyle relay, which earned a bronze medal in the final.

At the 2010 Commonwealth Games in New Delhi, Nay won the 200-metre backstroke in a Games record of 2.07.56.

Nay trains alongside Stephanie Rice at the St Peter's Western Swimming Club under Michael Bohl.

At the 2012 Summer Olympics, she competed in the 200 m backstroke, finishing 5th in final.

References

External links
 
 
 
 
 
 
 

1988 births
Living people
Sportspeople from the Gold Coast, Queensland
Sportswomen from Queensland
Australian female freestyle swimmers
Australian female backstroke swimmers
Olympic swimmers of Australia
Swimmers at the 2008 Summer Olympics
Swimmers at the 2012 Summer Olympics
Commonwealth Games gold medallists for Australia
Commonwealth Games medallists in swimming
Swimmers at the 2010 Commonwealth Games
World Aquatics Championships medalists in swimming
21st-century Australian women
Medallists at the 2010 Commonwealth Games